This list of bridges in Hamburg is incomplete, with an overview of their history and geography. In this article, the bridges are listed by Hamburg's three major rivers (Alster, Bille and Elbe) and the respectively crossed body of water (river, creek, canal, fleet, harbor basin or else). The Elbe is by far the largest of the three. Unlike Alster and Bille, the Elbe is also within the North Sea's tidal influence, and Elbe bridges differ substantially from the ones on Alster and Bille. All three rivers are fed by a number of smaller rivers and also feature a number of branches or sidearms.

Hamburg has more than 2,496 bridges, the most bridges of any city in Europe. Besides the Hanseatic city's mercantile and maritime history, the many rivers, canals and bridges lend to Hamburg's claim as the "Venice of the North". A 2004 report by the Department for Roads, Bridges and Waterways (LSBG) states a total number of 2,496 bridges in Hamburg, many more than cities like Venice, Amsterdam or Saint Petersburg. Given the city's waterborne geography and the port's heavy duty requirements, bridges in Hamburg also cover a great variety of architectural styles and innovative structural systems. Function-wise the total number of bridges break down to 1,172 road bridges, 987 railroad bridges (of which 407 Hochbahn bridges) and 470 footbridges (of which 290 within public parks and green spaces). 383 bridges are under management of the Hamburg Port Authority.

The most notable bridges in Hamburg include the historic inner-city bridges passing the Lower Alster (plus canals), the bridges across Speicherstadt canals, and the grand bridges spanning the Elbe's Norderelbe and Süderelbe anabranches, most commonly known as Elbbrücken.

Bridges in the Alster river system 

For centuries, the only bridges in Hamburg were across the Lower Alster and its canals in the Altstadt (old town). Repeated redirecting of the Alster canals resulted in ever new bridges to go with them. Ultimately, most of the pre-17th century bridges were destroyed in the Great Fire of 1842; the oldest remaining bridges in Hamburg are Zollenbrücke (1633) and Ellerntorsbrücke (1668).

Most of today's bridges in the inner city date from the 1840s reconstruction, during which over two dozen, mainly Renaissance Revival stone arch bridges were erected under then building director  (1809–1868). Maack's bridges tied into a general urban redevelopment of the inner city which was similarly seen in a number of European cities of the mid 19th century, and still characterizes many of the Neustadt's canals.

Most of the bridges across the Upper Alster and adjoining canals were first built in conjunction with the area's extensive residential developments from the 1860s onwards. Some of them were gradually replaced during the 1920s, with Fritz Schumacher in particular establishing a brick-arch-prototype for many bridges.

Alster 

Upper Alster 
A great number of the city's Alster bridges are located in the residential districts along the Upper Alster and its tributaries and accompanying side canals.

 For bridges from the Außenalster downstream, see #Lower Alster

The Alster is joined by the Tarpenbek at Eppendorfer Mühlenteich on its right side; a little further downstream, the Leinpfadkanal branches off the Alster's left side and creates a water link with a number of canals, including the Goldbekkanal, which in turn feeds into the Alster's system at Außenalster. Again on the right ride, the Isebekkanal joins the Alster's water shortly before reaching the Außenalster.

Lower Alster 

Bridges across the Lower Alster (from the Außenalster downstream); this section lists most bridges in the inner city districts Altstadt and Neustadt.

 For bridges across Binnenhafen, see #Oberhafen, Zollkanal and Binnenhafen

 For bridges across Zollkanal, see #Oberhafen, Zollkanal and Binnenhafen

Osterbek 
Bridges across Osterbek and Osterbekkanal

 Bramfelder Brücke (1900)
 U3 Osterbekkanal Hochbahn Viaduct (1912)
 Hufnerstraßenbrücke
 Käthnerortbrücke
 Schleidenbrücke
 Großheidesteg
 Heinz-Gärtner-Brücke
 Mühlenkampbrücke (1900)
 Langenzugbrücke (1864, 1909)
 For bridges from the Außenalster downstream, see

Uhlenhorster Kanal 
Bridges across Hofwegkanal and Uhlenhorster Kanal
 Grillparzerbrücke
 Fährbrücke
 Hofwegbrücke (1894)
 Herbert-Weichmann-Brücke (1893)
 Feenteichbrücke (1884)
For bridges from the Außenalster downstream, see #Lower Alster

Wandse 
Bridges across Wandse, Eilbek, Eilbekkanal and Mundsburger Kanal

 For bridges from the Außenalster downstream, see #Lower Alster

Bridges in the Bille river system

Bille 
Bridges across the Bille in Hamburg;  of the Bille's total of  lie within Hamburg.

 For bridges across Oberhafen, see #Oberhafen, Zollkanal and Binnenhafen

Hammerbrook canals 
Bridges across Hammerbrook and Rothenburgsort canals

Bridges in the Elbe river system 

Up until the 19th century, the Unterelbe had no fixed crossing. Travel time between Hamburg and Harburg took over two hours, and included two ferry trips across the Norder- and Süderelbe and a weary trip across the dikes of Wilhelmsburg. In 1817 the poorly maintained structure was washed away.

By the 1840s, with industrialization rapidly growing and trade through the Port of Hamburg skyrocketing, the need for a fixed crossing became apparent. At the time, the German states were a loose confederation of sovereign states, with the Free and Hanseatic City of Hamburg only controlling the northern Elbe shore, while the town of Harburg and the southern Elbe shore were part of the Kingdom of Hanover. Both sides built their railway lines: Hamburg–Bergedorf railway in 1842 (extended to Berlin in 1846), and Celle–Harburg railway in 1847 (connected to Hanover since 1845) – but no link across the Elbe. One of the biggest obstacles was Hanover's rivalry to Hamburg and her attempts to promote overseas trade through the Port of Harburg.

Twenty years on, the missing link became a void in the European rail network. Progress was finally possible after Prussia's annexation of Hanover in 1866; within a few years the Cologne-Minden Railway Company (CME) completed the Venlo–Hamburg railway as North German section of a Paris–Hamburg railway line, and thereby linking Hamburg with the industrial centers of the Rhineland and the Low Countries. The first railway bridges across Norder- and Süderelbe were built between 1869 and 1872, nowadays part of the Elbbrücken. Also starting in 1866, the port's infrastructure was substantially re-organized, in order to cope with the increased quantity of processed goods and to meet requirements of then commonly employed steam-powered vessels. This included an expansion of the port onto the islands of Steinwerder, Veddel and Wilhelmsburg, and set-up of an extensive rail network for the newly established Hamburg port railway (Hafenbahn). In 1887, the Neue Elbbrücke with its three lenticular trusses (each 102 meters long) became a Hamburg landmark and the first road bridge to cross the Norderelbe, serving many of the port's businesses. By 1899, the Alte Harburger Elbbrücke provided a road link across the Süderelbe.

New bridges across the Elbe anabranches and the Elbe islands' canals were and are continued to be built to this day. Over the years, some of them have set new standards or records in engineering. With the Elbe bridges being perceived as a symbol of the many changes associated with the Industrial Age, they were continuously subject to artistic and intellectual reception, among others by artists of the Hamburg Secession (Sezession) during the interwar period, or latest by the Internationale Bauausstellung during the 2000s. In 2015, the Speicherstadt was acknowledged as a World Heritage Site.

Elbe 
Up-stream, the next bridge (outside the Hamburg state borders) is located at Geesthacht; down-stream there are no more bridges.

Norderelbe 
Bridges across the Norderelbe

Süderelbe 
Bridges across the Süderelbe

Este 
Bridges across the Este in Hamburg; only  of the Este's total of  lie within the state borders of Hamburg.
 Cranzer Rollbrücke
 Estesperrwerkbrücke

Harburg canals 
Bridges across harbor basins and canals in Harburg; the port of Harburg is indirectly fed through the Seeve.

Wilhelmsburg canals 
Bridges across Elbe anabranches and canals on the island of Wilhelmsburg (including the islands of Steinwerder, Kleiner Grasbrook and Veddel)

Bridges elsewhere 
Please note, this section only lists bridges and viaducts in Hamburg, not listed above (i.e. only bridges and viaducts not crossing a body of water).

Railway bridges and viaducts

Road bridges and viaducts 

 Hochstraße Elbmarsch (1973, 4,258 m)
 Kersten-Miles-Brücke (1897, 47 m)
 Simon-von-Utrecht-Brücke

Foot bridges 
 Cremonbrücke (1982)
 Johan-van-Valckenburgh-Brücke

See also 

 St. Pauli Landing Bridges (Landungsbrücken)
 List of rivers of Hamburg
 List of bridges

Literature 
 Sven Bardua: Brückenmetropole Hamburg, Dölling und Galitz, Hamburg, 2009
 Horst Beckershaus: Die Hamburger Brücken: ihre Namen, woher sie kommen und was sie bedeuten, Convent, Hamburg, 2007, 
 Ralf Lange: Architekturführer Hamburg/Architectural Guide to Hamburg, Edition Axel Menges, Fellbach, 1995,

References

External links 

 Landesbetrieb Straßen, Brücken und Gewässer (LSBG) – Department for Roads, Bridges and Waterways 
 Bridges in Hamburg at brueckenweb.de 

!
Bridges
Bridges, Hamburg
Hamburg
Bridges, Hamburg